John is a common male given name in the English language ultimately of Hebrew origin. The English form is from Middle English Ion, Ihon, Jon, Jan (mid-12c.), itself from Old French Jan, Jean, Jehan (Modern French Jean), from Medieval Latin Johannes, alterated form of Late Latin Ioannes, or the Middle English personal name is directly from Medieval Latin, which is from the Greek name Ioannis (Ιωάννης), originally borne by Hellenized Jews transliterating the Hebrew name Yochanan, the contracted form of the longer name , meaning "Yahweh is Gracious" or "Yahweh is Merciful". There are numerous forms of the name in different languages; these were formerly often simply translated as "John" in English, but are increasingly left in their native forms (see sidebar).

It is among the most commonly given names in Anglophone, Arabic, European, Latin American, Persian and Turkish countries. Traditionally in the Anglosphere, it was the most common, although it has not been since the latter half of the 20th century. John owes its unique popularity to two highly revered saints, John the Baptist (forerunner of Jesus Christ) and the apostle John (traditionally considered the author of the Gospel of John); the name has since been chosen as the regnal or religious name of many emperors, kings, popes and patriarchs. Initially, it was a favorite name among the Greeks but it flourished in all of Europe after the First Crusade.

Origins 

The name John is a theophoric name originating from the Hebrew name , or in its longer form , meaning "Yahweh has been gracious". Several obscure figures in the Old Testament bore this name, and it grew in popularity once borne by the high priest Johanan  and especially by King John Hyrcanus  In the second temple period, it was the fifth most popular male name among Jews in Judaea and was borne by several important rabbis, such as Yochanan ben Zakai and Yochanan ben Nuri.

Germanic derivatives 
The Germanic languages (including German, English and Scandinavian) produced the masculine Johann (also Johan (Dutch)), Joan, Jan and Janke (Dutch), Jannis, Jens (Danish and Frisian), Jóhannes, Jóhann, (Icelandic and Faroese), Jöns (Swedish), Hans (German, Dutch and Scandinavian)

Name statistics 
John was the most popular name given to male infants in the United States until 1924, and though its use has fallen off gradually since then, John was still the 20th most common name for boys on the Social Security Administration's list of names given in 2006.

John was also among the most common masculine names in the United Kingdom, but by 2004 it had fallen out of the top 50 names for newborn boys in England and Wales. By contrast Jack, which was a nickname for John but is now established as a name in its own right, was the most popular name given to newborn boys in England and Wales every year from 1995 to 2005. It is also the third most common name in the United States, with an estimated 3.18 million individuals as of 2021 according to the Social Security Administration.

In other languages

People with name John

Royalty 
 John, King of England (1166–1216)
 Prince John of the United Kingdom (1905–1919), youngest son of King George V
 John of Eltham, Earl of Cornwall (1316–1336), second son of Edward II
 John of Gaunt, 1st Duke of Lancaster (1340–1399), third son of Edward III
 John of Lancaster, 1st Duke of Bedford (1389–1435), second son of Henry IV
 Prince Alexander John of Wales (1871), third son and youngest child of Edward VII
 John I of Aragon, (1350–1396), King of Aragon
 John II of Aragon, (1398–1479), King of Aragon
 John of Bohemia, (1296–1346), Count of Luxembourg and King of Bohemia
 John I of Castile, (1358–1390), King of Castile
 John II of Castile, (1405–1454), King of Castile
 John I of France, (1316), King of France and Navarre
 John II of France, (1319–1364), King of France
 John Sigismund Zápolya, (1540–1571), King of Hungary
 John I of Münsterberg, (1380–1284), Duke of Münsterberg
 John III of Navarre, (1469–1516), King of Navarre
 John I Albert (1459–1501), King of Poland
 John II Casimir Vasa (1609–1672), King of Poland
 John III Sobieski (1629–1696), King of Poland
 John I of Portugal, (1357–1433), King of Portugal
 John II of Portugal, (1455–1495), King of Portugal
 John III of Portugal, (1502–1557), King of Portugal
 John IV of Portugal, (1604–1656), King of Portugal
 John V of Portugal, (1689–1750), King of Portugal
 John VI of Portugal, (1767–1826), King of Portugal
 John, Duke of Valencia de Campos (1349–1396), son of Peter I of Portugal and Inês de Castro
 John, Constable of Portugal (1400–1442), son of John I of Portugal
 John I of Sweden, (1201–1222), King of Sweden
 John II of Sweden, (1455–1513), King of Denmark and king of Sweden during the Kalmar Union
 John III of Sweden, (1537–1592), King of Sweden
 Charles XIV John, (1763–1844), King of Sweden and king of Norway, first king in the Bernadotte dynasty

Politicians 
 John Adams (1735–1826), American statesman, attorney, diplomat, writer, and Founding Father who served as the second president of the United States from 1797 to 1801
 John Adams (Virginia politician) (1773–1825), Mayor of Richmond, Virginia
 John Adams (New York politician) (1778–1854), Congressman from New York
 John Adams (Ohio politician) (born 1960), Ohio House of Representatives
 John Adams (journalist) (1819–1???), American lawyer, politician and journalist in Maine
 John Adams Sr. (1691–1761), father of John Adams and grandfather of John Quincy Adams
 John Adams Sr. (Nebraska politician) (1876–1962), American minister, lawyer, and politician
 John Adams Jr. (Nebraska politician) (1906–1999), American lawyer and politician
 John Adams II (1803–1834), American government functionary and businessman, son of John Quincy Adams and grandson of John Adams
 John Quincy Adams (1767–1848), American statesman, diplomat, lawyer, and diarist who served as the sixth president of the United States from 1825 to 1829, son of John Adams
 John Quincy Adams II (1833–1894), American lawyer, politician, and member of the Adams political family, grandson of John Quincy Adams II, great-grandson of John Adams
 John J. Allen Jr. (1899–1995), U.S. representative from California's seventh congressional district
 John Judson Ames (1821–1861), American politician and California Pioneer
 John Anderson (New Jersey politician) (1665–1736), colonel who served as acting governor of New Jersey in 1736
 John Anderson (Maine politician) (1792–1853), United States Representative from Maine
 John T. Anderson (1804–1879), American politician in Virginia
 John Alexander Anderson (1834–1892), United States Representative from Kansas
 John C. Anderson (Wisconsin politician) (1862–1???), Wisconsin state assemblyman
 John Anderson (Wisconsin senator) (1870–1954), Wisconsin state senator
 Jack Z. Anderson (1904–1981), United States Representative from California
 John Hope Anderson (1912–2005), American politician in Pennsylvania
 John Anderson Jr. (1917–2014), Governor of Kansas, 1961–1965
 John B. Anderson (1922–2017), United States Representative from Illinois and 1980 presidential candidate
 John C. Anderson (lawyer) (born 1975), United States Attorney for the District of New Mexico
 John N. Anderson, American politician in California
 Johnny Anderson (politician), member of the Utah House of Representatives
 Sir John Anderson, 1st Baronet, of Mill Hill (died 1813), British politician, MP for City of London, 1793–1806
 John Anderson (diplomatic writer) (1795–1845), Scottish diplomatic writer
 John Anderson (colonial administrator) (1858–1918), British governor of Straits Settlements and later of Ceylon
 John Anderson, 1st Viscount Waverley (1882–1958), British civil servant and politician
 John Anderson, 3rd Viscount Waverley (born 1949), British peer
 John Anderson (trade unionist), British trade union leader
 John Hawkins Anderson (1805–1870), member of the Canadian Senate
 John Anderson (Newfoundland politician) (1855–1930), Newfoundland businessman and politician
 John Victor Anderson (1918–1982), Canadian politician in Alberta
 John Gerard Anderson (1836–1911), Scottish-born educationalist and public servant in colonial Queensland
 John Anderson (Australian politician) (born 1956), Deputy Prime Minister of Australia and Leader of the National Party 1999–2005
 John Anderson (mayor) (1820–1897), mayor of Christchurch, New Zealand, blacksmith, engineer, businessman
 Crawford Anderson (John Crawford Anderson, c. 1848–1930), New Zealand politician, MP for Bruce electorate
 John Attygalle (1906–1981), Inspector-General of Sri Lanka Police from 1966 to 1967
 John Bacon (Massachusetts politician) (1738–1820), US Representative from Massachusetts
 John F. Bacon (1789–1860), Clerk of the New York State Senate, and U.S. Consul at Nassau, Bahamas
 John L. Bacon (1878–1961), mayor of San Diego, California
 John Bailey (MP) (died 1436), MP for Cricklade and Calne
 John Bailey (Australian politician) (born 1954), Australian politician
 John Bailey (Massachusetts politician) (1786–1835), Member of the U.S. House of Representatives from Massachusetts
 John Edgar Bailey (1897–1958), Northern Irish politician
 John H. Bailey (1864–1940), American politician, senator and representative in Texas
 John Moran Bailey (1904–1975), United States politician, chair of the Democratic National Committee
 John Mosher Bailey (1838–1916), U.S. Representative from New York
 John Bailey (Irish politician) (1945–2019), member of Dun Laoghaire/Rathdown County Council
 John Bailey (Victorian politician) (1826–1871), Australian politician
 John D. Bailey (1928–2018), American mayor of St. Augustine, Florida
 John Baker (fl. 1407), English MP for Lyme Regis, 1407
 John Baker (fl. 1421), English MP for Devizes, 1421
 John Baker (died 1544) (by 1503–44), English MP for Radnorshire
 Sir John Baker (died 1558) (1488–1558), English speaker of the House of Commons
 John Baker (MP for Bedford) (by 1501–1538 or later), English mayor and MP of Bedford
 John Baker (by 1531–1604/6), English MP for Horsham and Bramber
 John Baker (MP for Canterbury) ( – 1831), British MP for Canterbury
 John Baker (representative) (1769–1823), United States congressman from Virginia
 John Baker (Baker Brook) (1796–1868), Canadian political activist in Baker Brook, New Brunswick
 John Baker (Australian politician) (1813–1872), briefly the Premier of South Australia
 Sir John Baker (Portsmouth MP) (1828–1909), British MP for Portsmouth
 John Tamatoa Baker (1852–1921), Hawaiian rancher, sheriff and governor
 John Baker (Labour politician) (1867–1939), British Labour MP for Bilston
 John Baker (Wisconsin politician) (1869–1???), American politician from Wisconsin
 John Baker (defensive lineman, born 1935) (1935–2007), American football player and then sheriff of Wake County, North Carolina
 John Baker (Indiana politician) (1832–1915), United States congressman from Indiana
 John S. Baker (1861–1955), American politician from Washington
 Sir John Baker, 2nd Baronet (1608–1653), English politician
 John A. Baker Jr. (1927–1994), U.S. diplomat
 John Arnold Baker (1925–2016), British judge and politician
 John Baker II (1780–1843), sheriff of Norfolk County, Massachusetts, 1834–1843
 John All Barham (1843–1926), American politician
 John Bear (politician), American politician and businessman
 John Black (Wisconsin politician) (1830–1899), French American immigrant and Democratic politician
 John Bidwell (1819–1900), Californian politician
 John M. Bolton (1901–1936), American businessman and politician
 John Boscawen (born c.1957), New Zealand politician
 John Boozman (born 1950), American politician
 John C. Breckinridge (1821–1875), American vice president
 John Y. Brown Sr. (1900–1985), American attorney and politician
 John H. Bryden (born 1943), Canadian politician
 Jeb Bush (John Ellis Bush, born 1953), American politician who served as the 43rd Governor of Florida from 1999 to 2007
 John V. Byrne (born 1928), American Republican
 John Moors Cabot (1901–1981), American diplomat and U.S. Ambassador
 John Calvin Coolidge Sr. (1845–1926), American politician and businessman from Vermont, father of Calvin Coolidge
 John C. Calhoun (1782–1850), American vice president
 John Coleman Calhoun (1871–1950), Canadian politician in Alberta
 John F. Carew (1873–1951), U.S. Representative from New York
 John M. Carroll (politician) (1823–1901), U.S. Representative from New York
 John Lee Carroll (1830–1911), American politician in Maryland
 John Carroll (mayor) (1836–1903), mayor of Dunedin
 John E. Carroll (1877–1955), Mayor of Seattle
 John A. Carroll (1901–1983), American jurist and politician in Colorado
 John Carroll (Ohio politician) (died 1985), member of the Ohio House of Representatives
 John Carroll (Manitoba politician) (1921–1986), Canadian politician in Manitoba
 John Carroll (Hawaii politician) (1929–2021), member of the Hawaii Senate and House of Representatives
 John Carroll (trade unionist) (active 1969–1990), Irish trade unionist and senator
 John Chafee (1922–1999), American politician 
 Calvin Coolidge (John Calvin Coolidge Jr., 1872–1933), American politician and lawyer, 30th President of the United States from 1923 to 1929
 John Tyler Cooper (1844–1912), American politician
 John R. Culbreath (1926–2013), American politician
 John F. Cusack (1937–2014), American politician from Massachusetts
 John Cusack (Australian politician) (1868–1956), Australian politician
 John Davies (British businessman) (1916–1979), British businessman, director-general of the CBI, and Conservative MP and cabinet minister
 John Bennett Dawson (1798–1845), American politician 
 John Diehl (politician) (born 1965), American politician
 John Dodd (1717–1782), English politician
 John Driscoll (Montana politician) (born 1946), American writer and politician
 John Porter East (1931–1986), American Republican U.S. senator 
 John Edgar (politician) (1750–1832), Irish-American pioneer and politician
 John Edwards
 Johan Elferink (born 1965), Australian politician
 John Patton Erwin (1795–1857), American Whig politician
 John De Saram (born 1929), Permanent Representative of Sri Lanka to the United Nations from 1998 to 2002
 John Fetterman (born 1969), American politician, U.S. Senator Elect from Pennsylvania
 John F. Fitzgerald (1863–1950), American politician
 John Garang (1945–2005), Sudanese politician and revolutionary leader
 John P. Garfield (born 1949), American former member of the Michigan House of Representatives
 John Nance Garner (1868–1967), American vice president
 John Glen (mayor) (1809–1895), mayor of Atlanta in 1855
 John Glenn (Alberta) (1833–1886), early Alberta settler
 John Thomas Glenn (1845–1899), mayor of Atlanta from 1889 to 1891
 John Glen (politician) (born 1974), British politician
 John Gomomo (1945–2008), South African Unionist and activist.
 John H. Hager (1936–2020), American politician 
 John Henry Hager (Iowa politician) (1871–1952), American politician
 John Church Hamilton (1792−1882), American historian, biographer, and lawyer
 John P. Harllee (1942–2017), American politician
 John Willie Kofi Harlley (1919–1980s), Ghanaian senior police officer and politician
 John Joseph Harper (1951–1988), Canadian aboriginal leader
 John Harrison (diplomat), 17th-century English diplomat
 John Harrison (died 1669) (1590–1669), English politician who sat in the House of Commons as MP for Lancaster variously between 1640 and 1669
 John Harrison (Canadian politician) (1908–1964), member of Parliament for Meadow Lake, Saskatchewan
 John Harrison (mayor), mayor of North Tyneside, England
 John Scott Harrison (1804–1878), American Congressman for Ohio, 1853–1857; son of President William Henry Harrison and the father of President Benjamin Harrison
 John Hart (1879–1957), 23rd premier of British Columbia
 John Isaac Heard (1787–1862), Irish Member of the UK Parliament for Kinsale
 John T. Heard (1840–1927), American politician
 John Henry, Margrave of Moravia (1322–1375), Royal family member of the Holy Roman Empire
 John Henry (Maryland politician) (1750–1798), U.S. senator from and governor of Maryland
 John Vernon Henry (1767–1829), American politician, New York State comptroller
 John Flournoy Henry (1793–1873), U.S. representative from Kentucky
 John Henry (representative) (1800–1882), U.S. representative from Illinois
 John Snowdon Henry (1824–1896), British politician from South-East Lancashire
 J. L. Henry (John Lane Henry, 1831–1907), Supreme Court of Texas judge
 John Henry (Australian politician) (1834–1912), Tasmanian House of Assembly member and treasurer of Tasmania
 Prince Johannes Heinrich of Saxe-Coburg and Gotha (1931–2010), Hungarian prince
 John Henry (Ontario politician) (born 1960), Canadian politician, mayor of Oshawa, Ontario
 John Henry (Cook Islands politician), Cook Islander politician
 John Hicks (politician) (1715–1790), land agent and politician in Nova Scotia
 John Hill (North Carolina politician) (1797–1861), United States Representative from North Carolina
 John Y. Hill (1799–1859), American builder and Kentucky state legislator
 John Hill (Australian politician) (born 1949), member of the South Australian House of Assembly
 John Hill (Florida politician) (born 1931), American politician
 John Hill (New Jersey politician) (1821–1884), United States Representative from New Jersey
 John Hill (Texas politician) (1923–2007), American lawyer and politician
 John Hill (Virginia politician) (1800–1880), United States Representative from Virginia
 John Fremont Hill (1855–1912), governor of Maine
 John Jerome Hill (1918–1986), American politician
 John Philip Hill (1879–1941), United States Representative from Maryland
 John H. Holdridge (1924–2001), U.S. Ambassador to Singapore and Indonesia
 John T. Hoffman (1828–1888), Governor of New York from 1869–1872
 John Hoffman (Minnesota politician) (born 1965), Minnesota state senator
 John Horgan (born 1959), Canadian politician and the current Premier of British Columbia
 John Horgan (Australian politician) (1834–1907), Australian politician, Western Australia MLC
 John Horgan (Irish politician) (1876–1955), Irish politician
 John Horgan (Irish nationalist) (1881–1967), Irish Cork-born nationalist politician, solicitor and author
 John Herbert Ilangatileke, Sri Lankan Sinhala member of the 2nd State Council of Ceylon for Puttalam
 John Ince (activist) (born 1952), Canadian activist, politician, author, and lawyer
 John Jay, American politician, statesman, revolutionary, diplomat, and the first Chief Justice of the United States
 John Johnson (Ohio congressman) (1805–1867), politician
 John A. Johnson (Minnesota politician) (1883–1962), Minnesota politician
 John A. Johnson (Wisconsin), Wisconsin state assemblyman from Madison
 John Albert Johnson (1861–1909), 16th governor of Minnesota
 John Anders Johnson (1832–1901), Wisconsin state senator
 John E. Johnson (Brandon) (1873–1951), Wisconsin state assemblyman from Brandon, Wisconsin
 John E. Johnson (Utica) (fl. circa 1868), Wisconsin state assemblyman from Utica, Wisconsin
 John J. Johnson (1926–2016), Missouri state senator
 John Warren Johnson (1929–2023), Minnesota state legislator
 John Telemachus Johnson (1788–1856), U.S. Representative from Kentucky
 John Johnson (Kansas City mayor) (1816–1903), mayor of Kansas City, Missouri
 J. Neely Johnson (1825–1872), California politician and politician
 John Johnson (b. 1833) (1833–1892), Wisconsin State Assemblyman
 John Johnson (Ohio state representative) (born 1937), member of the Ohio House of Representatives
 John Johnson Sr. (1770–1824), Chancellor of Maryland
 John Johnson Jr. (1798–1856), Chancellor of Maryland
 John Johnson (Indiana judge) (1776–1817), associate justice of the Indiana Supreme Court
 John T. Johnson (Oklahoma judge) (1856–1???), associate justice of the Oklahoma Supreme Court
 John B. Johnson (politician) (1885–1985), American politician in the South Dakota State Senate
 John Ramsey Johnson, associate judge of the Superior Court of the District of Columbia
 J. B. Johnson (Florida politician) (1868–1940), 23rd Florida Attorney General
 John S. Johnson (North Dakota politician) (1854–1941), member of the North Dakota House of Representatives
 John F. Kennedy (1917–1963), American politician, served as the 35th President of the United States from 1961 to 1963
 John Kerry (born 1943), American politician and diplomat who served as the 68th United States Secretary of State from 2013 to 2017
 John Lionel Kotelawala (1895–1980), Prime Minister of Sri Lanka from 1953 to 1956
 John Lansing Jr. (1754–1829?), American politician who disappeared
 John Lee (government official) (born 1957), Hong Kong politician
 John Limbert (born 1943), American diplomat
 John H. Long, Canadian political figure
 John B. Macy (1799–1856), U.S. Representative from Wisconsin
 John Macy (1917–1986), United States Government administrator and civil servant
 John Mahama (born 1958), Ghanaian politician and former president of Ghana
 John Major (born 1943), Prime Minister of the United Kingdom from 1990 to 1997
 John Major (17th-century English MP), English politician and Member of Parliament
 Sir John Major, 1st Baronet (1698–1781), English merchant and Member of Parliament
 John Cyril Malloy (1930–2014), American politician
 John Manley (born 1950), Canadian politician who served as the eighth deputy prime minister of Canada from 2002 to 2003
 John S. Marmaduke (1833–1887), American politician
 John McCain (1936–2018), American statesman and US Navy officer, United States Senator for Arizona from 1987 to 2018
 John McConnel (1806–1899), Australian politician
 John Foster McCreight (1827–1913), first premier of British Columbia
 John Duncan McRae, member of the Legislative Assembly of British Columbia, 1949–1952
 John J. McRae, American politician in Mississippi
 John McRae (British Columbia politician), member of the Legislative Assembly of British Columbia, 1920–1924
 John Moore (Louisiana politician) (1788–1867), American statesman
 John Fru Ndi (born 1941), Cameroonian politician
 John Verdun Newton (1916–1944), Australian politician
 John Nilson, Canadian politician 
 John Nkadimeng (1927–2020), South African politician and anti-apartheid activist
 John Paul (judge) (1839–1901), US politician and judge
 John Paul Jr. (judge) (1883–1964), US politician and judge
 John Paul (minister) (1795–1873), Scottish minister
 John Paul (pioneer) (1758–1830), US politician and city founder
 John Prescott (Indiana politician), American politician
 John Gladstone Rajakulendran (1907–1950), Sri Lankan Tamil teacher and politician
 John Reagan (New Hampshire politician) (born 1946), New Hampshire politician
 John Henninger Reagan (1818–1905), American politician
 John Roberts (born 1955), American lawyer and jurist who serves as Chief Justice of the United States
 John Robbins (congressman) (1808–1880), American congressman from Pennsylvania
 John Robson (1824–1892), Canadian politician, who served as the ninth premier of British Columbia
 John Senhouse Goldie-Taubman (1838–1898), Manx politician
 John Sidoti, Australian independent politician
 John Streltzer (1901–1985), Colorado legislator
 John H. Tolan (1877–1947), American politician and lawyer
 John H. Trumbull (1873–1961), American politician who served as the 70th Governor of Connecticut from 1925 to 1931
 John Herbert Turner (1834–1923), 11th premier of British Columbia
 John Tyler (1790–1862), tenth president of the United States
 John Tyler Sr., 15th governor of Virginia, United States District Judge of the United States District Court for the District of Virginia, father of John Tyler
 John Van Buren, United States lawyer, official, politician, son of Martin Van Buren
 John Walker (Arkansas politician) (1937–2019), member of the Arkansas House of Representatives
 John Walker (Missouri politician) (1770–1838), State Treasurer of Missouri
 John Walker (Virginia politician) (1744–1809), U.S. Senator, public official, and soldier
 John A. Walker (Iowa politician) (1912–2012), American politician
 John M. Walker Jr. (born 1940), chief judge of the U.S. Court of Appeals for the Second Circuit
 John M. Walker (Pennsylvania politician) (1905–1976), Pennsylvania State Senator and lieutenant-gubernatorial nominee
 John Randall Walker (1874–1942), U.S. Representative from Georgia
 John Smith Walker (1826–1893), Minister of Finance of the Kingdom of Hawaii
 John Williams Walker (1783–1823), U.S. Senator from Alabama
 John Crompton Weems (1777–1862), American politician
 John Weir (politician) (1904–1995), Australian politician
 John Wemyss, 1st Earl of Wemyss (1586–1649), Scottish politician
 John Yakabuski (born 1957), Canadian politician
 John Young (died 1589) (by 1519–1589), of Bristol, MP for Devizes, West Looe, etc.
 John Young (MP for Marlborough), in 1559, MP for Marlborough
 John Young (MP for New Shoreham) (fl. 1586–1597), MP for New Shoreham, Sussex
 John Allan Young (1895–1961), politician in Saskatchewan, Canada
 John Andrew Young (1916–2002), American politician from Texas
 John Duncan Young (1823–1910), US congressman from Kentucky
 John Young, 1st Baron Lisgar (1807–1876), UK MP, NSW Governor, Canadian Governor General
 John Young (Canadian politician) (1811–1878), member of the Canadian House of Commons
 John Young (governor) (1802–1852), Governor of New York
 John Young (advisor) (–1835), British-born government advisor of Kamehameha I
 John Young (Australian politician) (1842–1893), New South Wales politician
 John Young (judge), Federal Court of Australia judge
 John Young (jurist) (1919–2008), Australian jurist
 John Young (Scottish politician) (1930–2011), Conservative and Unionist Member of the Scottish Parliament
 John Young (seigneur) (–1819), Scottish-born Canadian land entrepreneur, jurist, and politician
 John Darling Young (1910–1988), Lord Lieutenant of Buckinghamshire, 1969–1984
 John M. Young (1926–2010), American politician from Wisconsin
 John Young (Indiana politician), American politician
 John Young (New Brunswick politician, born 1841) (1841–1907), Canadian politician
 John Young (New Brunswick politician, born 1854) (1854–1934), Canadian politician

Businessmen 
 John G. Agar (lawyer) (1856–1935), American lawyer
 John Anderson (Scottish businessman) (1747–1820), Scottish merchant and founder of Fermoy, Ireland
 John Aspinall (zoo owner) (1926–2000), British casino and zoo owner
 John Wilford Blackstone Sr. (1796–1868), American lawyer
 John Vernou Bouvier Jr.
 John Vernou Bouvier III
 John W. Brady (1869 or 1870–1943), American lawyer
 John Coolidge
 John Davis (British businessman) (1906–1993), English managing director of the Rank Organization, later Chairman
 John A. Eastman (1821–1895), American lawyer
 John Eastman, American lawyer
 John F. Grundhofer (1939–2021), American businessman
 John M. Harrell (1828–1907), American lawyer
 John W. Henry (born 1949), American businessman and owner of sports teams
 John Henry Hill (1791–1882), American businessman, educator and missionary
 John Hill (planter) (1824–1910), Scottish-born American industrialist and planter
 John Hill (businessman) (1847–1926), Australian coach-horse operator
 John J. Hill (1853–1952), English-born American stonemason and builder
 John A. Hill (1858–1916), American editor and publisher, co-founder of McGraw-Hill
 John Sprunt Hill (1869–1961), American lawyer, banker and philanthropist
 John W. Hill (1890–1977), American public relations executive
 John Hindley, 1st Viscount Hyndley (1883–1963), British businessman
 John E. Irving (1932–2010), Canadian businessman
 John Jay (lawyer) (1817–1894), American diplomat and lawyer, grandson of John Jay, the American Founding Father and statesman
 John F. McGee (1861–1925), United States district judge
 John Sackville Labatt (1880–1952), Canadian businessman
 John Marshall (Kansas judge) (1858–1931), American justice of the Kansas Supreme Court
 John McAfee, (1945–2021), British-American computer programmer, businessman and prisoner
 John Preston, Lord Fentonbarns (died 1616), Scottish lawyer and judge
 John Paul (judge) (1839–1901), US politician and judge
 Jack W. Robbins (1919–2005), American prosecutor at Nuremberg trials
 John D. Rockefeller (1839–1937), American business tycoon
 John D. Rockefeller Jr. (1874–1960), American financier, philanthropist, son of John D. Rockefeller
 John D. Rockefeller III (1906–1978), American philanthropist, son of John D. Rockefeller Jr.
 John Aspinwall Roosevelt (1916–1981), American businessman, sixth and youngest son of Franklin D. Roosevelt
 John Ellis Roosevelt, Roosevelt family member
 John Alexander Weir (1894–1942), Canadian lawyer and professor

Military 
 John Joseph Abercrombie (1798–1877), American brigadier general
 John Worthington Adams (1764–1837), British general in India
 John Giles Adams (1792–1832), U.S. commander at the Battle of Stillman's Run during the 1832 Black Hawk War
 John Adams (Confederate Army officer) (1825–1864), US Army officer
 John G. B. Adams (1841–1900), Civil War Medal of Honor recipient
 John Mapes Adams (1871–1921), Boxer Rebellion Medal of Honor recipient
 John Adams (Royal Navy officer) (1918–2008), British rear admiral
 John G. Adams (1932–2003), Army counsel in the Army-McCarthy hearings
 John Adams (Canadian general) (born 1942), Canadian military leader
 John F. Aiso (1909–1987), American nisei military leader
 John Aiken (RAF officer) (1921–2005), Royal Air Force officer
 John Alcock (RAF officer) (1892–1919), Royal Air Force officer
 John Andrews (Medal of Honor) (1821–1???), United States Navy Ordinary Seaman 
 John Taylor Arms (1887–1953), United States Navy officer and etcher
 John H. Aulick (1787–1791–1873), United States Navy officer
 John Cushing Aylwin (1780–1813), Officer in the United States Navy during the War of 1812
 John Babcock (1900–2010), last known surviving veteran of the Canadian military to have served in the First World War
 John M. Bacon (1844–1913), American general
 John Bacon (loyalist) (died 1783), Loyalist guerilla fighter during the American Revolutionary War
 John Baker (American Revolutionary War) (1731–1787), American Revolutionary War hero, for whom Baker County, Georgia was named
 John Baker (RAF officer) (1897–1978), British air marshal
 John Drayton Baker (1915–1942), United States Navy officer
 John Baker (general) (1936–2007), Australian Chief of the Defence Force
 John F. Baker Jr. (1945–2012), American soldier, Medal of Honor recipient
 John Baker (Royal Navy officer) (1660–1716), English naval officer, MP for Weymouth and Melcombe Regis
 John Baker (Medal of Honor, 1876) (1853–1???), American soldier
 John Henry Balch (1896–1980), United States Naval Reserve officer
 John Balmer (1910–1944), senior officer and bomber pilot in the Royal Australian Air Force
 John Sanford Barnes (1836–1911), United States Navy officer
 John D. Barry (1839–1867), officer in the Confederate States Army during the American Civil War
 John R. Baylor (1822–1894), Senior officer of the Confederate States Army
 John Bello (born 1946), United States Navy officer
 John Bell Blish (1860–1921), United States Navy officer
 John Bigelow Jr. (1854–1936), United States Army lieutenant colonel
 John L. Borling (born 1940), retired major general of the United States Air Force
 John Buford (1826–1863), United States Army cavalry officer
 John Bush (Royal Navy officer) (1914–2013), British Royal Navy officer
 John Cooke (Royal Navy officer) (1762–1805), English Royal Navy officer
 John G. Cowell (1785–1814), officer in the United States Navy during the War of 1812
 John Cubbon (1911–1997), British Army officer and entrepreneur
 John Owen Donaldson (1897–1930), American World War I flying ace
 John A. Dramesi (1933–2017), United States Air Force Colonel
 John Dundas (RAF officer) (1915–1940), Royal Air Force fighter pilot and flying ace of the Second World War 
 John Eglit (1874–1914), United States Navy seaman serving in the
 John Eisenhower, United States Army officer, diplomat, and military historian, second and youngest son of Dwight D. Eisenhower
 John C. England (1920–1941), United States Navy officer
 John Heaphy Fellowes (1932–2010), United States Navy captain and pilot
 John P. Flynn (1922–1997), United States Air Force officer
 John D. Foley (1918–1999), United States Army Air Forces gunner
 John Franklin (1786–1847), British Royal Navy officer
 John M. Franklin (1896–1975), American general
 John Frost (British Army officer) (1912–1993), airborne officer of the British Army 
 John Gingell (1925–2009), senior Royal Air Force commander
 John Harllee (admiral) (1914–2005), American admiral
 John Harrison (VC 1857) (1832–1865), Irish recipient of the Victoria Cross
 John B. Henry Jr., United States Air Force general
 John Joseph Henry (1758–1811), American Revolutionary War soldier
 John Hamar Hill or Johnnie Hill (1912–1998), British Royal Air Force officer
 John Hill (courtier) (before 1690–1735), British general and courtier, brother of Abigail Masham, Baroness Masham
 John Hill (British Army officer) (fl. 1777–1783), British Army officer during the American War of Independence
 John Hill (Royal Navy officer) (c. 1774–1855)
 John Hill (Indian Army officer) (1866–1935), British general
 John Thomas Hill (1811–1902), British Army officer
 John Hotaling (1824–1886), American soldier
 John Martin Howard (1917–1942), United States Navy officer
 John Illingworth (1903–1980), English naval engineer in the Royal Navy 
 John Irving (Royal Navy officer) (1815–c. 1848), British officer in the Royal Navy
 John Johnson, 8th Seigneur of Sark (died 1723), Seigneur of Sark, 1720–1723
 Sir John Johnson, 2nd Baronet (1741–1830), loyalist leader during the American Revolution
 John "Liver-Eating" Johnson (1824–1900), American frontier figure
 John Johnson (Medal of Honor, 1839) (1839–1???), United States Navy sailor
 John Johnson (Medal of Honor, 1842) (1842–1907), Norwegian-American Medal of Honor recipient
 John D. Johnson (general), U.S. Army general
 John Paul Jones (1747–1792), Scottish-American naval captain who was the United States' first well-known naval commander in the American Revolutionary War
 John Kennedy (Medal of Honor) (1834–1910), American soldier
 John Doby Kennedy (1840–1896), general in the Confederate States Army during the American Civil War
 John J. Kennedy (Republic of Texas politician) (1814–1880), soldier, lawyer and sheriff
 Sir John Kennedy (British Army officer, born 1878) (1878–1948), British general
 Sir John Kennedy (British Army officer, born 1893) (1893–1970), British general
 John Pitt Kennedy (1796–1879), British military engineer
 John Thomas Kennedy (1885–1969), American soldier
 John A. Kjellstrom (1923–2015), American lieutenant general
 John Kelvin Koelsch (1923–1951), United States Navy officer
 John Lerew (1912–1996), Royal Australian Air Force officer
 John B. Magruder (1807–1871), American and Confederate military officer
 John Minor Maury (1795–1824), Lieutenant in the United States Navy
 John S. McCain Jr. (1911–1981), United States Navy admiral who served in conflicts from the 1940s through the 1970s, including as the Commander, United States Pacific Command, father of John McCain
 John S. McCain Sr. (1884–1945), U.S. Navy admiral and the patriarch of the McCain military family, grandfather of John McCain
 John Neville (general) (1731–1803), American Revolutionary War officer later prominent in the Whiskey Rebellion
 John T. Newton (1793–1857), United States Navy officer
 John Verdun Newton (1916–1944), Australian Royal Australian Air Force (RAAF) officer
 John Pitcairn (1722–1775), Marine Service officer
 John R. Redman (1898–1970), United States Navy admiral
 John Hamilton Roberts (1881–1962), Canadian Army two-star general
 John Q. Roberts (1914–1942), United States Navy officer, pilot, and Navy Cross recipient
 John W. Roberts (1921–1999), United States Air Force four-star general
 John Roberts (Royal Navy officer) (born 1924), British admiral
 John K. Singlaub (1921–2022), United States Army general
 John Alexander Tyler, Son of John Tyler
 John P. Van Leer (1825–1862), Union Army officer
 John Walker (RAF officer) (born 1936), Chief of Defence Intelligence
 John Walker (Medal of Honor) (1845–1???), American Indian Wars soldier and Medal of Honor recipient
 John Walker (officer of arms) (1913–1984), English officer of arms
 John Anthony Walker (1937–2014), American communications specialist convicted in 1985 of spying for the Soviet Union
 John C. Walker, Indiana physician and officer during the American Civil War
 John George Walker (1821–1893), general in the Confederate States Army during the American Civil War
 John Grimes Walker (1835–1907), United States Navy admiral
 John T. Walker (USMC) (1893–1955), United States Marine Corp general
 John Young (naval officer) (1740–1781), United States captain in the Continental Navy during the American Revolutionary War

Musicians 
 John Abercrombie (guitarist) (1944–2017), American jazz guitarist
 John Adams (born 1947), American composer
 John Luther Adams (born 1953), American composer
 John Addison (1920–1998), English composer
 John Anderson (jazz trumpeter) (1921–1974), American jazz musician
 John Anderson (producer) (born 1948), Northern Irish composer and producer
 John Anderson (musician) (born 1954), American country musician
 John Anderson, vocalist for the British rock band Charlie (founded 1971)
 John Bailey (luthier) (1931–2011), maker of fine guitars in England
 John Bailey (producer), Canadian recording engineer, producer
 John Barry (1933–2011), English film composer
 John Beal (composer), American film composer
 John Blow (1649–1708), English composer
 John Bonham (1948–1980), drummer/percussionist for Led Zeppelin
 John Bull (1562–1628), English composer
 John Bush (musician) (born 1963), American metal vocalist for Armored Saint and Anthrax
 John Cage (1912–1992), American composer
 John Casken (born 1949), English composer
 John Colianni (born 1966), American jazz pianist
 John Coltrane (1926–1967), American jazz saxophonist and composer
 John Cooper (musician) (born 1975), American bassist and vocalist for Skillet
 John Corabi (born 1959), American hard rock singer and guitarist
 John Corigliano (born 1938), American composer
 John Dankworth (1927–2010), English jazz musician
 John Darnielle (born 1967), American singer-guitarist, founder of The Mountain Goats and half of The Extra Lens
 John David Davis (1867–1942), English composer
 John Debney (born 1956), American composer and conductor of film, television, and video game scores
 John Denver (1943–1997), American folk and country singer
 John Deacon (born 1951), British bass player for Queen
 John Doe (musician) (born 1953), American singer, songwriter, actor, and poet
 John Dowland (1563–1626), English composer
 John W. Duarte (1919–2004), English composer and guitarist
 John Dunstaple (1390–1453), English composer
 John Entwistle (1944–2002), English bassist for The Who
 John Fahey (1939–2001), American fingerstyle guitarist and composer
 John Farmer (c.1570–c.1601), English madrigal composer
 John Field (1782–1837), Irish composer
 John L. Finley (1935–2006), American astronaut
 John Finley (musician) (born 1945), Canadian musician
 John Conant Flansburgh (born 1960), American singer-guitarist, founder of Mono Puff, and one half of They Might Be Giants
 John Frusciante (born 1970), guitarist for Red Hot Chili Peppers
 John Fogerty (born 1945), lead singer and guitarist for Creedence Clearwater Revival
 John Foreman (musician) (born 1972), Australian musician
 John Foulds (1880–1939), English composer
 John Gardner (1917–2011), English composer
 John Maxwell Geddes (1941–2017), Scottish composer and academic
 John D. H. Greenwood (1889–1975), English composer
 John Harbison (born 1938), American composer
 John Heard (musician) (1938–2021), jazz bassist
 John Hicks (pianist) (1941–2006), American jazz pianist and composer
 John Hill (conductor) (born 1843), Australian church organist and choirmaster
 John Hill (musician) (active from 1993), American guitarist with the Apples in Stereo and Dressy Bessy
 John Hill (record producer) (active 2008 and after), American record producer, songwriter, and musician
 John Ireland (1879–1962), English composer
 John Jarrard (1953–2001), American country music songwriter
 John Jenkins (1592–1678), English composer
 John Joubert (1927–2019), English composer
 John Kander (born 1927), American musical theatre composer
 John Kinsella (1932–2021), Irish composer
 John Lanchbery (1923–2003), English-Australian composer
 John Legend (born 1978), American singer, songwriter, pianist, and record producer
 John Lennon (1940–1980), English singer-songwriter and founding member of the Beatles
 John Charles Julian Lennon (born 1963), English singer, son of John Lennon
 John Sidney Linnell (born 1959), American singer-songwriter and one half of They Might Be Giants
 John Lowe (musician) (born 1942), English pianist
 John Henry Maunder (1858–1920), English composer and organist
 John McCabe (1939–2015), British composer and classical pianist
 John Blackwood McEwen (1868–1948), Scottish composer
 John Newman (singer) (born 1990), English singer, musician, songwriter and record producer
 John Oates (born 1948), American musician, half of Hall & Oates
 John O'Neill (guitarist) (born 1957), Irish rhythm guitarist
 John Knowles Paine (1839–1906), American composer
 John Pickard (born 1963), British composer
 John Prine (1946–2020), American singer-songwriter 
 John Rutter (born 1945), English composer, conductor and choral arranger
 John Scofield (born 1951), American guitarist and composer
 John Philip Shenale, Canadian composer, arranger, musician and producer
 John Philip Sousa (1854–1932), American composer
 John Stainer (1840–1901), British composer
 John Stanley (1712–1786), English composer
 John Sykes (1909–1962), English composer
 John Sykes (born 1959), guitarist for Thin Lizzy and Whitesnake
 John Tavener (1944–2013), 20th century English composer
 John Taverner (1490–1545), 16th century English composer
 John Veale (1922–2006), English composer
 John White (born 1936), English experimental composer
 John Whitehead (singer) (1948–2004), American singer and songwriter
 John Wilbye (1574–1638), English composer
 John Williams (born 1932), American composer, conductor, and pianist
 John Woolrich (born 1954), English composer
 John York (musician) (born 1946), American bassist and guitarist
 John Zorn (born 1953), American composer, saxophonist and bandleader

Scientists 
 John Abercrombie (physician) (1780–1844), Scottish physician and philosopher 
 John Adams (physicist) (1920–1984), British accelerator physicist
 John Couch Adams (1819–1892), British mathematician and astronomer
 John Franklin Adams (1843–1912), British amateur astronomer and author of stellar maps
 John Stacey Adams, behavioral psychologist known for equity theory
 John Till Adams (1748–1786), English Quaker physician
 John Alderson (physician) (1758–1829), English physician
 John Lawrence Angel (1915–1986), British-American biological anthropologist
 John Baker (biologist) (1900–1984), British biologist and anthropologist
 John Baker, Baron Baker (1901–1985), British engineer
 John Gilbert Baker (1834–1920), British botanist
 John Norman Leonard Baker (1893–1971), British geographer
 John Holland Baker (1841–1930), New Zealand surveyor and public servant
 John Berkenhout (1726–1791), English physician
 John Roosevelt Boettiger, grandson of Franklin D. Roosevelt
 Sir John Carroll (astronomer) (1899–1974), British astronomer
 John Alexander Carroll (died 2000), American history professor
 John Bissell Carroll (1916–2003), American cognitive scientist
 John L. Carroll, American legal academic
 John M. Carroll (information scientist) (active since born 1950), American information scientist
 John Clauser (born 1942), American theoretical and experimental physicist
 John Clements Davis (born 1938), American geologist
 John Dee (1527– 1608 or 1609), English mathematician, astronomer, astrologer, teacher, occultist, and alchemist
 John Fothergill (physician) (1712–1780), English physician
 John Goodsir (1814–1867), Scottish anatomist and a pioneer in the formulation of cell theory
 John Henry (toxicologist) (1939–2007), English toxicologist
 John Hill (botanist) (1716–1775), English botanist, editor, journalist, and novelist
 John Christopher Columbus Hill (1828–1904), American engineer
 John Edwards Hill (1928–1997), British mammalogist
 Sir John McGregor Hill (1921–2008), British nuclear physicist and administrator
 John Hill (physician) (1931–1972), American plastic surgeon
 John R. Lukacs (born 1947), American anthropologist
 John Mearsheimer (born 1947), American political scientist
 John von Neumann (1903–1957), Hungarian-American mathematician, physicist, computer scientist, engineer and polymath
 John Robbins (congressman) (1808–1880), American congressman from Pennsylvania
 John G. Trump, uncle of Donald Trump
 John Truss (born 1947), British mathematician
 John Van Denburgh (1872–1924), American herpetologist
 John Weir (geologist) (1896–1978), Scottish geologist and palaeontologist
 John Wood (surgeon) (1825–1891), British surgeon at King's College Hospital
 John Henry Wood (1841–1914), English entomologist
 John L. Wood (born 1964), American chemist
 John Ligertwood Paterson (1820–1882), Scottish medical doctor known for working in Bahia, Brazil
 John S. Fossey, British chemist and professor at the University of Birmingham
 John Medley Wood (1827–1915), South African botanist
 John Nicholas Wood, British neurobiologist
 John Turtle Wood (1821–1890), British architect, engineer, and archaeologist

Writers 
 John David Anderson (born 1975), American writer
 John J. Anderson (1956–1989), writer and editor covering computers and technology
 J. Redwood Anderson (1883–1964), English poet
 John Baker (author) (born 1942), British novelist
 John Baker (legal historian) (born 1944), English legal historian and academic
 John Roman Baker (born 1944), British playwright and activist
 John Banville (born 1945), Irish writer
 John Barth (born 1930), American writer
 John Tucker Battle (1902–1962), American screenwriter
 John Betjeman (1906–1984), English poet, writer and broadcaster
 John Braine (1922–1986), English writer
 John Bunyan (1628–1688), English writer and preacher
 John Bryant (journalist) (1944–2020), British journalist
 John Buchan (1875–1940), British author and politician
 John Carroll (author) (born 1944), Australian conservative writer
 John Carroll (journalist) (1942–2015), American journalist and editor
 John Cochran (born 1987), American television writer, and former reality television personality
 John Francis Carroll (1858–1917), newspaper publisher and editor
 John Cheever (1912–1982), American novelist and short story writer
 John Clare (1793–1964), English poet
 John Maxwell Coetzee (born 1940), South African-Australian novelist and essayist
 John Cunliffe (author), English children's book author 
 John Donne (1572–1631), English poet and cleric
 John Dryden (1631–1700), English poet and playwright
 John T. Dugan (1920–1994), American screenwriter
 John Dunkel (1915–2001), American screenwriter
 John Englehardt (born 1987), American fiction writer and educator
 John Fetterman (1920–1975), American journalist
 John Fowles (1926–2005), English novelist
 John Galsworthy (1867–1933), English novelist and playwright
 John Gardner (1933–1982), American novelist and educator
 John Gardner (1926–2007), English spy and thriller novelist
 John Gray (1866–1934), English poet
 John Grant (author) (1949–2020), pseudonym used by science fiction writer Paul Le Page Barnett
 John Grant (1930–2014), Scottish author and illustrator
 John L. Greene (1912–1995), American screenwriter
 John Grisham (born 1955), American writer
 John Gunther (1901–1970), American journalist and author
 M. John Harrison (born 1945), author
 John Hersey (1914–1993), American journalist and novelist
 John Hill (screenwriter) (1947–2017), American screenwriter
 John Hockenberry (born 1956), American journalist and author
 John Irving (born 1942), American novelist and screenwriter
 John Major Jenkins (born 1964), American author and populariser of the Maya calendar
 John Keats (1795–1821), English romantic poet
 John le Carré (1931–2020), British-Irish author
 John Masefield (1878–1967), English poet and writer
 John McClain, American sportswriter
 John McPhee (born 1931), American writer
 John Milton (1608–1674), English poet and intellectual
 John Muir (1838–1914), Scottish-born American naturalist and author
 John Mulaney (born 1982), American comedian known for his work on Saturday Night Live
 John Munonye (1929–1999), Igbo writer
 John Dos Passos (1896–1970), American novelist
 John Pearson (author) (1930–2021), English novelist
 John Preston (English author) (born 1953), English journalist and novelist
 John Pudney (1909–1977), British poet, journalist and author
 John Rappaport (screenwriter), American screenwriter
 John Rechy (born 1931), Mexican-American novelist and essayist
 John Romita Sr., father of John Romita Jr.
 John Romita Jr., son of John Romita Sr.
 John Robbins (author) (born 1947), American author, known for his books on food and health
 John Scalzi (born 1969), American science fiction author
 John Steinbeck (1902–1968), American writer
 John Suchet (born 1944), English author
 John Ronald Reuel Tolkien (1892–1973), English writer and philologist
 John Updike (1932–2009), American novelist
 John Verney (author) (1913–1993), English author and illustrator
 John Weir (writer) (born 1959), American writer
 John Whittington, American screenwriter
 John Wyndham (1903–1969), English writer
 John Younger (writer) (1785–1860), writer, shoemaker, and poet

Actors 
 John Aasen (1890–1938), American actor
 John G. Adolfi (1888–1933), American actor
 John Alderton (born 1940), English retired actor
 John Ales (born 1969), American actor
 John Alvin (actor) (1917–2009), American actor
 John Patrick Amedori (born 19??), American actor and musician
 John Amos (born 1939), American actor
 John Amplas (born 1949), American actor
 John Anderson (actor), (1922–1992), American actor
 John Anderson (director) (born 1954), American documentary film director, producer, editor and writer
 John Anderson (sportscaster) (born 1965), American ESPN television sports journalist and co-host of Wipeout
 John Anderson (TV personality) (born 1931), Scottish television personality, referee on the series Gladiators
 John H. Anderson, American set decorator
 John Murray Anderson (1886–1954), Newfoundland-American theater director
 John Aniston (1933–2022), Greek-born American actor father of actress Jennifer Aniston
 John Aprea (born 1941), American actor and comedian
 John Arledge (1906–1947), American actor
 John Asher (born 1971), American actor
 John Ashley (actor) (1934–1997), American actor
 John Astin (born 1930), American actor
 John Aylward (1946–2022), American actor
 John Baer (actor) (1923–2006), American actor
 John Bailey (1947–1994), American actor
 John Barrowman (born 1967), British-American actor
 John Barrymore (1882–1942), American actor
 John Blyth Barrymore (born 1954), American actor son of John Drew Barrymore
 John Drew Barrymore (1932–2004), American actor son of John Barrymore
 John Belushi (1949–1982), American actor and comedian
 John Boncore (1952–2013), American actor
 John Bowers (actor) (1885–1936), American actor
 John Boyega (born 1992), English actor
 John Brandon (actor) (1929–2014), American film and television actor
 John Byner (born 1938), American actor, comedian and impressionist
 John Candy (1950–1994), Canadian actor
 John Carlisle (actor) (1935–2011), British actor
 John Carradine (1906–1988), American actor
 John David Carson (1952–2009), American actor
 John Challis (1942–2021), English actor
 John Cliff (actor) (1918–2001), American film and television actor
 John Cornell (1941–2021), Australian actor
 John Cusack (born 1966), American actor, producer, and screenwriter
 John Diehl (born 1950), American actor
 John DiMaggio (born 1968), American actor and voice actor
 John Ducey (born 1969), American actor
 John Duda (born 1977), American actor
 John Dullaghan (1930–2009), American film, stage and television actor
 John Erwin (born 1936), American voice actor
 John Estrada (born 1973), Filipino actor
 John Forsythe (1918–2010), American actor
 John Franklin (actor) (born 1959), American actor
 John Garfield (1913–1952), American actor
 John Gielgud (1904–2000), English actor
 John Goodman (born 1952), American actor
 John Gordon Sinclair (born 1962), British voice actor
 John Bregar (born 1985), Canadian actor 
 John Hannah (born 1962), Scottish actor
 John Hasler (born 1974), English actor and voice actor
 John Heard (actor) (1946–2017), American actor
 John Heffernan (American actor) (1934–2018), American film, stage and television actor
 John Henry (actor) (1738–1794), Irish and early American actor
 John Hensley (born 1977), American actor
 John Hill (actor) (born 1977), American actor
 John Stephen Hill (born 1953), Canadian actor
 John Hill (actor) (born 1978), American actor
 John Hillerman (1932–2017), American actor 
 John Robert Hoffman, American actor, screenwriter, director and producer
 John Hora (1940–2021), American actor
 John Houseman (1902–1988), Romanian-born British-American actor
 John Hoyt (1905–1991), American actor
 John Hurt (1940–2017), English actor
 John M. Jackson (born 1950), American actor
 John Kassir (born 1957), American actor, voice actor and stand-up comedian
 John Krasinski (born 1979), American actor, director and producer
 John Lasell (born 1928), American film and television actor
 John Lawlor (actor), (born 1941), American actor and assistant director
 John Lebar, British actor
 John Lone (born 1952), Hong Kong-born American actor
 John Lithgow (born 1945), American actor, author, musician, poet and singer
 John Carroll Lynch (born 1963), American actor
 John Magaro (born 1983), American actor
 John Mahon (actor) (1938–2020), American film, stage and television actor
 John Malkovich (born 1953), American actor, voice actor, producer, director and fashion designer
 John Martin (actor) (born 1951), American film and television actor
 John C. McGinley (born 1959), American actor
 John Miljan (1892–1960), American actor
 John Mulaney (born 1982), American actor and stand-up comedian
 John Neville (actor) (1925–2011), English theatre and film actor
 John Alexander Luft "Xander" Mobus, American voice actor
 John O'Hurley (born 1954), American actor, comedian, author, game show host and television personality
 John Pankow (born 1954), American actor
 John Paragon (1954–2021), American actor, writer, and director
 John Paul (actor) (1921–1995), British actor
 John Pinette (1964–2014), American stand-up comedian, actor, and Broadway performer
 John Pleshette (born 1942), American actor and screenwriter
 John Robert Powers (1892–1977), American actor 
 John Ratzenberger (born 1947), American actor, voice actor, director and entrepreneur
 John C. Reilly (born 1965), American actor, comedian, screenwriter, producer and musician
 John Reynolds (born 1991), American actor
 John Ritter (1948–2003), American actor
 John Richardson (actor) (1934–2021), English actor
 John Franklyn-Robbins, British actor
 John Robbins (illustrator) (died 2016), host of the public television program Cover to Cover
 John Russell (actor) (1921–1991), American film and television actor
 John Paul Ruttan (born 2001), Canadian actor
 John P. Ryan (1936–2007), American actor
 John Schlesinger (1926–2003), English film and stage director, and actor
 John Schwab (born 1972), American actor, voice actor, musician and producer
 John Slattery (born 1962), American actor 
 John Snee (born 1974), American former film and television actor
 John Stahl (1953–2022), Scottish actor
 John Stamos (born 1963), American actor and musician
 John Stephenson (1923/1924–2015), American actor
 John Stocker (voice actor) (born 1947), Canadian voice actor
 John Todd (1876–1957), American actor
 John Travolta (born 1954), American actor and singer
 John Vernon (1932–2005), Canadian actor
 John Viener (born 1972), American actor, comedian, writer, and producer
 John Vivyan (1915–1983), American stage and television actor
 John Wayne (1907–1979), American actor and filmmaker
 John J. York (born 1958), American actor
 John Zacherle (1918–2016), American actor
 John Zenda (1944–1994), American film and television actor

Sportsmen 
 John (footballer) (born 1996), Brazilian footballer
 John Abercrombie (cricketer) (1817–1892), English cricketer
 John H. Adams (jockey) (1914–1995), American Hall of Fame jockey
 John Adams (basketball) (1917–1979), All-American basketball player from Arkansas
 John Adams (drummer) (1951–2023), perennial attendee of Cleveland Indians baseball home games
 John Adams (golfer) (born 1954), American professional golfer
 John Adams (judoka) (born 1960), Dominican Republic judoka
 John Adams (ice hockey, born 1920) (1920–1996), Canadian ice hockey winger in the NHL with the Montreal Canadiens
 John Adams (ice hockey, born 1946), Canadian ice hockey goaltender
 John Aeta (born 2000), Solomon Islands footballer
 John Alderton (American football) (1931–2013), American professional football defensive lineman 
 John Andrews (American football) (born 1948), American football player
 John Anson (born 1949), Canadian retired professional wrestler
 John Askey (born 1964), English professional football manager and former player
 John Babcock (wrestler) (fl. 1904), American Olympic wrestler
 John Bacon (footballer) (born 1973), Irish footballer
 John Bacon (cricketer) (1871–1942), English cricketer
 John Bailey (footballer, born 1950), English footballer and chairman
 John Bailey (footballer, born 1957), English footballer
 John Bailey (footballer, born 1969), English footballer
 John Bailey (rugby league) (born 1954), Australian rugby league footballer and coach
 John Bailey (English cricketer) (born 1940), English cricketer
 John Bailey (New Zealand cricketer) (born 1941), New Zealand cricketer
 John Bates (American football) (born 1997), American football player
 John Beale (footballer) (1930–1995), English footballer
 John Beedell (1933–2014), New Zealand-born, Canadian sprint canoer 
 John Biolo (1916–2003), American football player
 John Bonica (1917–1994), Italian professional wrestler
 John Brannon (American football) (born 1998), American football player
 John Brown (wide receiver) (born 1990), American football wide receiver
 John Bruhin (1964–2022), American football guard
 John Cena (born 1977), American professional wrestler, actor, television presenter and rapper
 John Condrone (1960–2020), American professional wrestler
 John Cuffe (1880–1931), Australian-born English first-class cricketer
 John Cusack (hurler) (1925–2002), Irish hurler, active in the 1940s and 1950s
 John Diehl (American football) (1936–2012), American football player
 Johnny Dodd (rugby league), rugby league footballer of the 1950s for New Zealand, and Wellington
 John-John Dohmen (born 1988), Belgian field hockey player
 John Duffy (soccer), U.S. soccer player at 1928 Summer Olympics
 John Edgar (English footballer) (1930–2006), English footballer
 John Edgar (Scottish footballer), Scottish footballer
 John John Florence (born 1992), American surfer
 John Hawley Edwards (1850–1893), footballer; a founder of Welsh Football Association
 John Dunlop Edwards (1860–1911), Jack Edwards, Australian cricketer
 John Edwards (footballer, born 1875) (1875–1???), English footballer
 John Edwards (Canadian football) (1912–2005), Canadian football player
 John Edwards (cricketer, born 1928) (1928–2002), Australian cricketer
 John Edwards (Barbadian cricketer) (1909–1976), Barbadian cricketer
 John Edwards (Australian footballer) (born 1942), Australian rules footballer
 John Edwards (canoeist) (born 1954), Canadian sprint canoer
 John Edwards (basketball) (born 1981), American basketball player
 John Edwards (racing driver) (born 1991), American racing driver
 John Farragher (born 1957), Australian former professional rugby league footballer 
 John Ferguson Sr. (1938–2007) American professional ice hockey player and executive
 John Franklin (cyclist), British cyclist
 John Franklin (footballer) (1924–2005), English football forward
 John "Johnny" Gargano (born 1987), American professional wrestler
 John Garlington (1946–2000), American football linebacker
 John Goodner (1944–2005), American football coach
 John Gunter (football manager), American football manager
 John Heard (basketball) (born 1939), Australian Olympic basketball player
 John Henderson (darts player) (born 1973), Scottish darts player
 John Henry (catcher) (1889–1941), American baseball catcher
 John Henry (footballer) (born 1971), Scottish footballer
 John Henry (outfielder/pitcher) (1863–1939), American baseball outfielder/pitcher
 John Hicks (American football) (1951–2016), lineman
 John Hicks (baseball) (born 1989), American professional baseball catcher and first baseman 
 John Hicks (cricketer) (1850–1912), English first-class cricketer
 John Hicks (field hockey) (born 1938), New Zealand field hockey player
 John Ethan Hill (1865–1941), American mathematician and college football coach
 John Hill (Scottish footballer) (fl. 1891–1892), Scottish footballer
 Johnny Hill (footballer) (1884–1???), Scottish footballer
 Jack Hill (footballer, born 1897) (1897–1972), English football player and manager
 John Hill (rugby union) (fl. 1925), Australian rugby union player
 John Hill (rugby league), rugby league footballer of the 1940s and 1950s
 John Hill (American football) (1950–2018), American football player
 John Hill (New Zealand footballer) (born 1950), Irish-born New Zealand footballer
 John Mac Hill (1925–1995), Australian rules footballer for Collingwood
 John Tye Hill (born 1982), American football player
 John Hill (boat racer) (1933–1993), British powerboat racer
 John Hill (ice hockey) (born 1960), American ice hockey coach
 John Hill (wrestler) (1941–2010), Canadian professional wrestler
 John Hindley (born 1965), real name of retired British professional wrestler Johnny Smith
 John Hoffman (defensive end) (born 1943), American football defensive end
 John Hoffman (running back) (1925–1987), American football running back
 John Hoffman (baseball) (1943–2001), Major League Baseball catcher
 John Horgan (hurler) (1950–2016), Irish sportsperson
 John G. Horgan (1866–1921), pocket billiards (pool) player
 John Houseman (baseball) (1870–1922), European Major League Baseball player
 John Hurd (1914–2001), American fencer
 John Kiley (1912–1993), organist at Fenway Park from 1953 to 1989 and at the Boston Garden from 1941 to 1984
 John Kiley (baseball) (1859–1940), Major League Baseball outfielder and pitcher
 John Klug (born 1965), Australian rules former professional footballer
 John Kronus (1969–2007), American professional wrestler
 John Lindsay (Paralympian) (born 1970), Australian Paralympic athlete
 John Layfield (born 1966), American retired professional wrestler
 John Madden (1936–2021), American football coach and television announcer
 John Madden (hurler) (born 1968), Irish hurling selector and player
 John Madden (ice hockey) (born 1973), Canadian ice hockey player
 John Matuszak (1950–1989), American football defensive end
 John McFall (athlete) (born 1981), British Paralympic sprinter
 John McMullin (baseball) (1849–1881), American baseball player
 John McMullin (golfer), American golfer
 John McSeveney (1931–2020), Scottish footballer and manager
 John Major (cricketer) (1861–1930), English cricketer
 John Minton (1948–1995), real name of American professional wrestler Big John Studd
 John Moeti (1967–2023), South African professional footballer
 John John Molina (born 1965), Puerto Rican boxer
 John Morrison (born 1979), American professional wrestler
 John Moll (1913–1942), English rugby union player
 John Morkel (1928–2010), South African born Rhodesian international rugby union player
 John Wayne Murdoch (born 1988), American professional wrestler
 John Moshoeu (1965–2015), South African professional footballer
 John Naber (born 1956), American former competitive swimmer
 John Hunter Nemechek (born 1997), American racing driver
 John Nogowski (born 1993), American baseball player
 John Nord (born 1959), American retired professional wrestler
 John Paul (footballer), 19th century British footballer
 John Paul Sr. (racing driver) (1939–????), American automobile racing driver
 John Paul Jr. (racing driver) (1960–2020), American automobile racing driver
 John Pearson (cricketer) (1915–2007), English cricketer
 John Pearson (curler) (active 1959), Scottish curler
 John Pearson (footballer, born 1868) (1868–1931), English football player and referee
 John Pearson (footballer, born 1892) (1892–1937), Scottish football player
 John Pearson (footballer, born 1896) (1896–1979), English football player
 John Pearson (footballer, born 1935), English football player
 John Pearson (footballer, born 1946), English football player
 John Pearson (footballer, born 1963), English football player
 John Pearson (gymnast) (1902–1984), American gymnast
 John Pearson (sport shooter) (1926–1994), British Olympic shooter
 John Pesek (1894–1978), American professional wrestler
 John Maunsell Richardson (1846–1912), English cricketer, Member of Parliament and twice winner of the English Grand National
 John Richardson (Derbyshire cricketer) (1856–1940), English cricketer for Derbyshire County Cricket Club
 John Richardson (tennis) (1873–1???), South African Olympic tennis player
 Mick Richardson (John Mettham Richardson, 1874–1920), English footballer active in the 1890s
 John Richardson (Yorkshire cricketer) (1908–1985), English cricketer for Yorkshire County Cricket Club
 John Richardson (South African cricketer) (born 1935), South African cricketer for North Eastern Transvaal
 Jock Richardson (1906–1986), Scottish footballer
 John Richardson (American football) (born 1945), American football player for the Miami Dolphins
 John Richardson (baseball), American baseball player
 John Richardson (footballer, born 1949) (1949–1984), English football player for Brentford, Fulham and Aldershot
 John Richardson (footballer, born 1966), English football player for Colchester
 John Richardson (rower) (born 1944), Canadian rower who competed in the 1968 Summer Olympics
 John Roberts (footballer, born 1956), Australian rules footballer who played for South Melbourne/Sydney Swans and in South Australia
 John Roberts (footballer, born 1881) (1881–1956), Australian rules footballer who played for South Melbourne
 John Roberts Jr. (billiards player) (1847–1919), player of English billiards
 John Roberts (Shropshire cricketer) (born 1948), Shropshire cricketer
 John Roberts (Lancashire cricketer) (1933–2019), English cricketer
 John Roberts (Somerset cricketer) (born 1949), Somerset cricketer
 John Roberts (footballer, born 1857) (1857–1???), Welsh (from Llangollen) international footballer
 John Roberts (footballer, born 1858) (1858–1???), Welsh international footballer
 John Roberts (footballer, born 1885) (1885–19??), English footballer who played for Wolverhampton Wanderers and Bristol Rovers
 John Roberts (footballer, born 1887) (1887–19??), English-born footballer active in Italy for Milan and Modena
 John Roberts (footballer, born 1891) (1891–19??), Scottish footballer
 John Roberts (footballer, born 1944), Australian soccer player
 John Roberts (footballer, born 1946) (1946–2016), Welsh international footballer who played for Wrexham and Arsenal
 John Roberts (hurler) (1895–1987), Irish hurler
 John Roberts (rower) (born 1953), British Olympic rower
 John Roberts (rugby player) (1906–1965), Welsh rugby player
 John Roberts (American football) (1920–2012), American football, wrestling and track coach
 Jack Robson (football manager) (1860–1922), English full-time secretary manager of football clubs, including Middlesbrough and Manchester United
 Jack Robson (footballer), English footballer 
 John Robson (Australian footballer) (1933–2011), played with Richmond and St Kilda in the VFL
 John Robson (footballer, born 1950) (1950–2004), English football full-back for Derby County and Aston Villa
 John Robson (athlete) (born 1957), British middle-distance runner
 John Robson (canoeist), British canoe sailor
 Doug Robson (1942–2020), born John Douglas Robson and listed as John Robson in some databases, English football centre half for Darlington
 John de Saulles (1878–1917), American football player and coach
 John Stones (born 1994), English footballer
 John Tatum (born 1959), American retired professional wrestler
 John Tavares (born 1990), Canadian ice hockey player
 John Tenta (1963–2006), Canadian professional wrestler and sumo wrestler
 John Terry (born 1980), English professional football coach and former player 
 John Terry (baseball) (1877–1958), Major League Baseball pitcher who played for the Detroit Tigers
 John Terry (gridiron football) (born 1968), American football player
 John Terry (weightlifter) (1908–1970), American Olympic weightlifter
 John Thompson (basketball) (1941–2020), American college basketball coach
 John Thompson III (born 1966), American men's national basketball team
 John Kennedy Tod (1852–1925), Scottish rugby union player
 John Todd (footballer) (born 1938), Australian rules football player and coach
 John Todd (rugby league), rugby league footballer of the 1910s and 1920s
 John Tolos (1930–2009), Canadian professional wrestler
 John Tortorella (born 1958), American professional ice hockey coach and former player
 John Voight (athlete) (1926–1993), American sprinter
 John Weir (footballer), Scottish footballer
 John Williams (mixed martial artist) (1940–2015), Canadian retired mixed martial artist
 John Wood (baseball) (1872–1929), baseball player
 John Wood (canoeist) (1950–2013), Canadian Olympic flatwater canoer
 John Wood (racing driver) (born 1952), CART driver
 John Wood (rugby league) (born 1956), English rugby league footballer who played for Great Britain
 John Young (first baseman) (1949–2016), American baseball first baseman
 John Young (cricketer, born 1863) (1863–1933), English cricketer
 John Young (cricketer, born 1876) (1876–1913), English cricketer
 John Young (cricketer, born 1884) (1884–1960), English cricketer
 John Young (cyclist) (1936–2013), Australian cyclist
 John Young (field hockey) (born 1934), Canadian Olympic hockey player
 John Young (footballer, born 1888) (1888–1915), Scottish footballer
 John Young (footballer, born 1889) (1889–1???), Scottish footballer
 John Young (footballer, born 1891) (1891–1947), Scottish footballer
 John Young (footballer, born 1951), Scottish footballer and manager
 John Young (footballer, born 1957), Scottish footballer (Denver Avalanche)
 John Young (ice hockey), American ice hockey and roller hockey player
 John Young (rugby union) (1937–2020), English rugby union player
 John Young (swimmer) (1917–2006), Bermudian swimmer
 John Zimmerman (figure skater) (born 1973), American professional pair skater and coach

Criminals 
 John Arthur Ackroyd (died 2016), American murderer
 John Bodkin Adams (1899–1983), British criminal
 John Patrick Addis (1950–2006), American parental child kidnapper
 John Agrue (1947–2009), American serial killer
 John Alite (born 1962), Albanian American former Gambino crime family associate
 John Allen (1934–2015), British criminal
 John Ashley (1888 or 1895–1924), American outlaw
 John Balaban (serial killer) (1924–1953), Romanian-born serial killer
 John Battaglia (1955–2018), American murderer
 John Baughman (1941–2000), American murderer
 John Baxter (explorer) (1799–1841), Irish convict
 John C. Beale (born 1948), former senior policy advisor convicted of fraud and theft
 John William Bean (1824–1882), British criminal who attempted to assassinate Queen Victoria
 John Billee (1873–1890), American outlaw and Creek Indian
 John Bittrolff (born 1966), American murderer
 John Bodkin (c. 1720 – 1742), Irish murder
 John T. Bone (1947–2019), British pornographic film director who became a drug dealer
 John Bull (gunman) (1836–1929), English gunman
 John Dwight Canaday (1945–2012), American serial killer
 John Cannan (born 1954), British murderer, serial rapist, and serial abductor
 John Charles Bolsinger (1957–1988), American serial killer
 John Wilkes Booth (1838–1865), American who assassinated President Abraham Lincoln
 John Paul Chase (1901–1973), American robber
 John Childs, British hit man and serial killer
 John William Clouser (born 1932), American robber
 John Cooper (born 1944), Welsh serial killer
 John Coxon, pirate and fugitive
 John Martin Crawford (1962–2020), Canadian serial killer
 John Christie (1899–1953), English serial killer
 John Crenshaw (1797–1871), American kidnapper
 John Brennan Crutchley (1946–2002), American convicted kidnapper, rapist, and suspected serial killer
 John Cunningham, Irish drug smuggler and kidnapper
 John D'Amato (died 1992), American murder mobster
 John Darwin (born 1950), British criminal
 John Dickman (1864–1910), English murderer
 John Dillinger (1903–1934), American gangster of the Great Depression
 John Duffy (born 1958), British serial rapist
 John David Duty (1952–2010), American murderer
 John Eichinger (born 1972), American murderer
 John Ewell (born 1957), American serial killer 
 John Factor (1892–1984), American prohibition-era gangster and con artist
 John Fautenberry (1963–2009), American serial killer
 John Linley Frazier (1946–2009), American mass murderer
 John Wayne Gacy (1942–1994), American serial killer and sex offender
 John Albert Gardner (born 1979), American convicted double murderer, rapist, and child molester
 John Geoghan (1935–2003), American serial child rapist
 John Getreu (born 1944), American murderer and possible serial killer
 John Charles Gilkey (born 1968), American prolific serial thief
 John K. Giles (1895–1979), American inmate at Alcatraz prison
 John Gotti (1940–2002), American gangster
 John Haigh (1909–1949), English serial killer
 John Hamilton (gangster) (1899–1934), Canadian fugitive
 John Patrick Hannan (born 1933), Irish prison fugitive who holds the record for the longest escape from custody
 John Wesley Hardin (1853–1895), American Old West outlaw
 John Ruthell Henry (1951–2014), American serial killer
 John R. Hicks (1956–2005), American murderer
 John Hinckley Jr. (born 1955), American criminal
 John Hirst (born 1950), British convicted murderer
 John Michael Hooker (1953–2003), American serial killer
 John Joubert (1963–1996), American serial killer
 John Kinney (outlaw) (1847–1919), American outlaw of the Old West, who formed the John Kinney Gang
 John Kiriamiti (born 1950), Kenyan former bank robber
 John M. Larn (1849–1878), American lawman and later outlaw
 John Walker Lindh (born 1981), American who was captured as an enemy combatant during the United States' invasion of Afghanistan in November 2001
 John List (1925–2008), American mass murderer and fugitive
 John Ingvar Lövgren (1930–2002), Swedish serial killer
 John Makin (1845–1893), Australian murderer
 John Peter Malveaux (born 1964), American serial killer
 John Mason (outlaw) (18??–April 1866), American fugitive and one of the leaders of the Mason Henry Gang
 John McAfee (1945–2021), British-American computer programmer and businessman who committed suicide in prison
 John McCaffary (1820–1851), Irish-American murderer
 John Rodney McRae, American murderer and suspected serial killer
 John Middleton (1854–1885), American outlaw and friend of Billy the Kid
 John Murrell (bandit) (1806–1844), American outlaw
 John Palmer (criminal) (1950–2015), English gangster
 John Felton Parish (1933–1982), American mass murderer
 John Paul Sr. (racing driver) (born 1939), American racing driver, convicted felon and fugitive whose whereabouts are unknown
 John Parsons (born 1971), American fugitive
 John M. Pyle (born 1956), American fugitive
 John Richardson (convict) (1797–1882), Australian convict who accompanied several exploring expeditions as a botanical collector
 John Edward Robinson (born 1943), American serial killer, con man, embezzler, kidnapper, and forger
 John Wesley Robinson (1867–1915), American serial killer
 John Roselli (1905–1976), American influential mobster for the Chicago Outfit
 John Ruffo (born 1954), American fugitive whose whereabouts are unknown
 John Selman (1839–1896), American fugitive
 John Paul Scott (1927–1987), American criminal
 John Sontag (1861–1893), American outlaw
 John Svahlstedt (born 1947), Swedish serial rapist
 John Edward Swindler (1944–1990), American murderer
 John Tillmann (1961–2018), Canadian art thief
 John Thanos (1949–1994), American spree killer
 John Wojtowicz (1945–2006), American bank robber
 John Younger (1851–1874), American outlaw

Colonial people 
 John Custis (1678–1749), North American Colonial British politician
 John Parke Custis (1754–1781), son of Martha Washington
 John Wayles (1715–1773), American colonial planter and slave trader

Others 
 John O. Aalberg (1897–1984), Hollywood sound technician
 John Abercromby (monk) (fl. 1561), 16th-century Roman Catholic martyr, maybe fictitious 
 John Samuel Agar (1773–1858), English portrait painter and engraver
 John Judson Ames (1821–1861), California Pioneer
 John Anderson (classical scholar) (1870–1952), Camden Professor of Ancient History at the University of Oxford
 John Anderson (escaped slave), American slave who escaped to Canada in the 1860s, leading to a famous extradition case
 John S. Apperson (1878–1963), General Electric engineer
 John Asman, American sound engineer
 John de Borman (born 1954), French born British cinematographer
 John Bowen (pirate) (16??–1704), pirate of Créole origin active during the Golden Age of Piracy
 John Bozeman (1835–1867), American pioneer and frontiersman
 John J. Brooks, American lawman
 John Bush (set decorator), British set decorator
 John Buxton (ornithologist) (1912–1989), British scholar, university teacher, poet and an ornithologist
 John Cabot (145–c. 1500), Italian navigator and explorer
 John Cantlie (born 1970), British war photographer and correspondent
 John F. Carroll (1932–1969), one of 23 known people in medical history to have reached a height of 8 feet
 John Casali, American sound engineer
 John Cashman (journalist) (died 1945), American war correspondent for the International News Service
 John Cavanagh (designer) (1914–2003), Irish couturier
 John Clavie (died 1607), Scottish apothecary
 John Climacus (579–649), Christian monk
 John Chaffee, American gold miner
 John W. Chaffee (born 1948), American historian
 John Chambers (make-up artist) (1922–2001), American make-up artist
 John Cotton Dana (1856–1929), American library and museum director
 John Charles Darke (1806–1844), English surveyor and explorer
 John Davidson (traveller) (1797–1836), English traveller in Africa
 John Davis (sculptor) (1936–1999), Australian sculptor
 John F. Davis (artist) (born 1958), Australian artist, painter and video editor
 John Philip Davis (1784–1862), British portrait and subject painter
 John Scarlett Davis (1804–1845), English painter
 John Dawson Dewhirst (1952–1978), British teacher
 John E. Douglas (born 1944/1945), American retired special agent
 John Price Durbin (1800–1876), Chaplain of the Sentae, president of Dickinson College
 John R. Ellis, American visual effects artist
 John M. Falcone (1967–2011), American police officer
 John Favara (1929–1983), American person missing since 1980
 John Gallagher (cartoonist) (1926–2005), American cartoonist and illustrator
 John Paul Getty Jr. (1932–2003), American philanthropist and book collector
 John Paul Getty III (1956–2011), American grandson of American oil tycoon J. Paul Getty
 John L. Gihon (1839–1878), Philadelphia photographer
 John Goosey (died 2009), American murder victim
 John Gray (died 1858), owner of Greyfriars Bobby
 John Gregory (engineer) (1806–c.1848), English railway and naval engineer
 John F. Grundhofer (1939–2021), director of Donaldson Company
 John Gunther (public servant) (1910–1984), Australian public servant
 John Hancock (1737–1793), American Founding Father remembered for his large and stylish signature on the United States Declaration of Independence
 John Gordon Harris (1947–2019), Canadian policeman
 John Hartwell Harrison, M.D. (1909–1984), urologic surgeon
 John Harrison (director) (born 1948), writer, director, producer, and music composer
 John Harrison (Leeds) (1579–1656), benefactor of the Yorkshire town
 John C. Harrison, American law professor
 John Kent Harrison, television producer, director and writer
 John Leonard Harrison (1917–1972), British zoologist
 John Harrison (historian) (1847–1922), Scottish merchant, master tailor and historical author
 John Harrison (engraver) (1872–1954), British stamp engraver
 John Harrison (ice cream taster) (born 1942), American ice cream taster
 John B. Harrison (1861–1947), justice of the Oklahoma Supreme Court
 John Vernon Harrison (1892–1972), British structural geologist, explorer and cartographer
 John Henry, American folk hero whose existence is disputed
 John Henry (spy) (c. 1776–1853), British spy
 John Raymond Henry (1943–2022), American sculptor
 John Hejduk (1929–2000), American architect, artist, and educator
 John Hill (cartoonist) (1889–1974), New Zealand cartoonist
 John William Hill (1812–1879), British-born American artist
 John Hill (game designer) (1945–2015), American designer of Squad Leader and other wargames
 John Horgan (academic) (born 1940), Irish press ombudsman, former journalist, politician and professor
 John Horgan (journalist) (born 1953), American science journalist
 John Horgan (psychologist) (born 1974), Irish political psychologist, terrorism researcher, and professor
 John Horgan, chairman of the Western Australian Development Corporation
 John Hubley (1914–1977), American animation director, art director, producer and writer
 John Hurt (chaplain) (1752–1824), American Episcopal minister
 John Inglis (shipbuilder) (1842–1919), Scottish engineer and shipbuilder
 John Jay (builder) (1805–1888), British stonemason and builder in the nineteenth century
 John Clarkson Jay (1808–1891), physician and grandson of John Jay, the American Founding Father and statesman
 John Jay (filmmaker) (1915–2000), American ski filmmaker
 John F. Kennedy Jr. (1960–1999), American political-family member and journalist, son of John F. Kennedy
 John Knight (seafarer) (died 1606), British explorer
 John Kostuck (1892–1960), American salesman, piano tuner, and legislator
 John Lake (journalist) (born 1930), American sports journalist and editor who disappeared in 1967
 John Layfield (theologian) (died 1617), English scholar and Bible translator
 John Lounsbery (1911–1976), American animator and director
 John A. List (born 1968), American economist at the University of Chicago
 John M. Lloyd (1835–1892), American police officer, tavern owner, and bricklayer, known for testifying in the Abraham Lincoln assassination conspiracy trials
 John Majhor (1953–2007), Canadian radio and television host
 John William Mackail (1859–1945), Scottish academic
 John Masius (born 1950), American screenwriter
 John Means (comedian), American stand-up comedian
 John McMullin (silversmith) (1765–1843), American silversmith
 John McSweeney Jr. (1915–1999), American film editor
 John Middleton (giant) (1578–1623), English giant
 John Mosman (apothecary), apothecary at the Scottish court
 John Mosman (goldsmith), Scottish goldsmith based in Edinburgh
 John Mulaney (born 1982), American stand-up comedian
 John Elliott Neville, prisoner who died in 2019 after being restrained at the Forsyth County, North Carolina jail
 John Nevill, 3rd Earl of Abergavenny (1789–1845), English peer
 John Nevill, 5th Marquess of Abergavenny (1914–2000), British peer
 John Nevill, 10th Baron Bergavenny (c. 1614–1662), English peer
 John Boyle O'Reilly (1844–1890), Irish poet, journalist, author and activist
 John G. Palfrey (1796–1881), American clergyman and historian
 John Palfrey (born 1972), American educator, scholar, and law professor
 John Pasquin (born 1944), American director of film, television and theatre
 John Otunba Payne (1839–1906), Nigerian sheriff
 John Pitcairn Jr. (1841–1916), Scottish-born American industrialist
 John Gordon Purvis (born 1942), American man who spent nine years in prison for a murder he did not commit
 John Rando, American stage director
 John Neil Reagan (1908–1996), American radio station manager, elder brother of Ronald Reagan
 John Rich (director) (1925–2012), American film and television director
 John Ridge (c. 1802–1839), member of the Cherokee Nation
 John Robins (comedian) (born 1982), British comedian
 John Rogan (c. 1867–1905), American who was the second-tallest person ever
 John Rosengrant, American make-up and special effects artist
 John Smith (disambiguation)
 John Smith (1825–1910), Scottish dentist
 John Snorri Sigurjónsson (1973–2021), Icelandic high-altitude mountaineer
 John Solecki, American head of United Nations High Commissioner for Refugees
 John Sturges (1910–1992), American film director
 John Payne Todd (1792–1852), first son of Dolley Madison, adopted son of James Madison
 John V. Tolan (born 1959), American historian
 John Traill (1835–1897), Scottish coffee house owner
 John Anderson Truman (1851–1914), father of Harry S. Truman
 John Varvatos (born 1954), American menswear designer
 John M. Wallace (1815–1880), granduncle of Bess Truman
 John Warhurst (sound editor), American sound editor
 John F. Warren (1909–2000), American cinematographer
 John Weldon (animator) (born 1945), Canadian actor, composer, animator and movie director
 John B. Wood (1827–1884), American journalist
 John H. Wood Jr. (1916–1979), U.S. federal judge
 John Wood (millowner) (1758–1???), created the Howard Town Mills complex in Glossop, England
 John Wood (Bradford manufacturer) (1793–1871), English industrialist and factory reformer
 John Wood (explorer) (1812–1871), Scottish explorer of central Asia
 John Wood (photographer), Civil War photographer for Union Army
 John C. Young (pastor) (1803–1857), Centre College president

Pseudonyms 

 Bible John, unidentified serial killer
 Chicken John (born 1967 or 1968), musician, showman, activist, and author
 Jihadi John (1988–2015), nickname for Kuwaiti–born British militant Mohammed Emwazi
 John 5 (guitarist), American guitarist
 John Doe, placeholder name for an anonymous person

Fictional characters 

 John-117, also known as Master Chief, the protagonist of the Halo franchise
 John, a character in the Care Bears Movie II: A New Generation
 John, a character in the Doctor Who comic strip
 John-Boy, eldest son in The Waltons
 John, in the 1994 American black-comedy film The Ref
 John, in the American miniseries V
 John "Jack" Arnold, a character in the American coming-of-age, comedy-drama television series The Wonder Years
 John Barton, a character in the British soap opera Emmerdale
 John Bates, a character from Downton Abbey, married to Anna
 John Bender, a character from the film The Breakfast Club
 John Carik, also known as Bible John, a character from Marvel Comics
 John Clark, a character in Tom Clancy's Ryanverse
 John Connor, a character in the Terminator franchise
 John Constantine, a fictional character appearing in DC Comics franchise, including Hellblazer
 John Darling, one of the Darling children and the main character in the 1953 Walt Disney's animated film Peter Pan
 John Davis, a character on British soap opera, EastEnders
 John Davis, character in After Many Years
 Sergeant John Davis, a playable character in Call of Duty 2
 John Diggle (Arrowverse), from the Arrowerse franchise
 John Dillermand, the titular protagonist of John Dillermand
 John Doe, a character in the video game Batman: The Enemy Within
 John Dough, a gingerbread man brought to life in the Frank Baum book John Dough and the Cherub
 John Michael Dorian (J.D.), the main character and protagonist of the comedy-drama Scrubs
 John Drake (Danger Man), in the TV series Danger Man
 John Ellis, a character in the Netflix series Grand Army
 John Egbert, a character in the webcomic Homestuck
 John Worthington Foulfellow, also known as Honest John, a main character in the 1940 Walt Disney's animated film Pinocchio
 John Ross Ewing III, character from the American prime time soap opera Dallas and its 2012 continuation series
 John Herbert, a character in the animated television series Family Guy
 John Henry, a character/stage name of the comedian Norman Clapham, popular in BBC radio in the 1920s
 John Henry, a character in the 2006 comic series The Transformers: Evolutions
 John Henry, a character in the Terminator: The Sarah Connor Chronicles science-fiction series
 John Henry, alter ego of John Wilson, character in DC Comics
 John Henry Irons, also known as Steel, a character from DC Comics
 John Jonah Jameson, a newspaper publisher in Marvel Comics
 John Kramer, also known as Jigsaw, a character in the Saw franchise
 John Kimble, the protagonist in the 1990 American action comedy film Kindergarten Cop
 John Locke, one of the central characters in the American television series Lost
 John Marston, a central character in the Red Dead franchise
 John "Soap" MacTavish, a character in the Call of Duty franchise
 John McBain, a character in the American daytime dramas One Life to Live and General Hospital
 John McClane, the main protagonist of the Die Hard franchise
 John Paul McQueen, a character from the British soap opera Hollyoaks
 John "Ace" Merrill, a character in the 1986 American coming-of-age film Stand by Me
 John Milner, a character in the 1973 American coming-of-age comedy-drama film American Graffiti
 Father John Patrick Francis Mulcahy and Trapper John McIntyre, characters in the American war comedy-drama television series M*A*S*H
 John Murphy, in the TV series The 100
 John Nana, the main character in the 1988 American science-fiction action thriller film They Live
 John Rainbird, in the 1984 American science fiction horror film Firestarter
 John Rambo, the titular protagonist in the Rambo franchise
 John Redcorn, a character in the Fox animated series King of the Hill
 John Ridd, main character of the 1869 historical novel by R. D. Blackmore Lorna Doone: A Romance of Exmoor
 John Riggs, a character in the 1989 American-Canadian fantasy drama film Prancer
 Jack Robbins, a character in the British soap opera EastEnders
 Major John Russell, a character in the 1997 American science fiction drama film Contact
 John Shaunessy, a character in the 1979 American drama film Kramer vs. Kramer
 Long John Silver, antagonist of the Robert Louis Stevenson novel Treasure Island
 Sergeant John Spartan, a character in the 1993 American science fiction action film Demolition Man
 John "Hannibal" Smith, a character in the 1980s action-adventure television series The A-Team
 John Smith, a character in Mr. & Mrs. Smith
 John Stewart, a character in DC Comics, one of several characters known as Green Lantern
 John, a character in the children's science-fiction series The Tomorrow People
 John Beresford Tipton, the title benefactor of The Millionaire (TV series), a 1955–1960 American television series
 John Walker, also known as U.S. Agent, a superhero in Marvel Comics
 John "John-Boy" Walton Jr and John Walton Sr., characters in the American historical drama television series The Waltons
 John Warner and "Little John" Warner, characters in the American sitcom Jesse
 John H. Watson, associate of Sherlock Holmes
 John Witter, a character from Dawson's Creek: Pacey's father
 John Wick, the titular protagonist of the John Wick franchise

See also 
 
 
 Hanan (given name)

References 

English masculine given names
English-language masculine given names
Given names
Modern names of Hebrew origin
Irish masculine given names
Masculine given names
Norwegian masculine given names
Scottish masculine given names
Swedish masculine given names
Theophoric names
Welsh masculine given names